Transformative Works and Cultures is a peer-reviewed  open access academic journal published by the Organization for Transformative Works. The journal collects essays, articles, book reviews, and shorter pieces that concern fandom, fanworks, and fan practices. According to Humanities, Arts, Science and Technology Alliance and Collaboratory (HASTAC), the journal "supports the [Organization for Transformative Works's] mission to promote the legitimacy and sustainability of non-commercial fan creativity by providing a forum for innovative criticism in fan studies, broadly conceived."

The founding editors were Kristina Busse and Karen Hellekson, who remain the editors as of 2021. It covers "popular media, fan communities, and transformative works". A number of noted fan and media scholars sit on the journal's board, such as Henry Jenkins, Busse, Hellekson, Francesca Coppa, Paul Booth, Kathleen Fitzpatrick, Jason Mittell, and Rebecca Tushnet, among others. The journal has raised the academic profile of female fan communities and transformative works, including fan fiction, fan art, fan vids, and cosplay, by serving as a central publication venue for these topics. Coppa states that many second-wave fan fiction scholars, such as herself, started to publish in Transformative Works and Cultures and that the journal has "nurtured a new wave of scholars". Via a number of articles, the journal has had a hand in helping to spread Jenkins, Sam Ford, and Joshua Green's idea of "spreadable media".

TWC reached its 20th issue milestone in September 2015, which was commemorated with an online panel discussion by past contributors about the state of fan studies and the role of TWC.

References

External links
 Official website

Fandom
Fan fiction
Fan labor
Open access journals
Publications established in 2008